Acianthera hondurensis is a species of orchid native to the Atlantic slope of Mexico, Belize and Central America, and is found at elevations of 35–500 m. It is an epiphyte found in humid and riverine forests. It is likely affected by human activities such as agriculture and urban development, but can be found in protected areas such as Montes Azules Biosphere Reserve in México and Laguna Lachuá National Park and Chocón Machacas Protected Biotope in Guatemala.

References

hondurensis
Orchids of Mexico
Orchids of Belize
Orchids of Central America
Flora of Honduras